Sarah Asahina  (born 22 October 1996) is a Japanese judoka.

She won a silver medal at the 2017 World Judo Championships in Budapest.

References

External links
 
 
 

1996 births
Living people
Japanese female judoka
World judo champions
Sportspeople from Tokyo
Universiade gold medalists for Japan
Universiade medalists in judo
Medalists at the 2015 Summer Universiade
21st-century Japanese women